Giselle Pereira de Vasconcellos (born 20 November 1983), commonly known as Giselle, is a Brazilian women's international footballer who plays as a goalkeeper. She is a member of the Brazil women's national football team. She was a non-playing squad member at the 2003 FIFA Women's World Cup.

International career
Giselle was part of the Brazil under-20 selection at the FIFA U-20 Women's World Championships in 2002.

In July 2003 Giselle played for the senior Brazil women's national football team in two friendly games against Canada.

References

1983 births
Living people
Brazilian women's footballers
Brazil women's international footballers
Place of birth missing (living people)
2003 FIFA Women's World Cup players
Women's association football goalkeepers
Sociedade Esportiva Palmeiras (women) players